Strålsnäs is a locality situated in Boxholm Municipality, Östergötland County, Sweden with 410 inhabitants in 2010.

References

External links 

Populated places in Östergötland County
Populated places in Boxholm Municipality